Miroslav Adámek (18 February 1957, Vsetín – 22 January 2002, Vsetín) was a Czech painter, graphic artist and illustrator.

Career
In 1976–1980 he studied in Uherské Hradiště SUPS in graphic design, then studied at the Academy with professor Souček and Kolář (1980–1986).

He was noted in particular for his paintings and drawings used ideas in architecture such as sand-blasted glass and ceramics. During his career he showcased his work in over fifteen exhibitions in the Czech Republic and overseas.

See also
List of Czech painters

References

Czech graphic designers
Czech illustrators
1957 births
2002 deaths
People from Vsetín
20th-century Czech painters
20th-century Czech male artists
Czech male painters